Presidential elections were held in Syria on 10 July 1953. There was only one candidate, Adib Shishakli, with voters asked to approve or reject his candidacy. A reported 99.7% of voters voted in favour, with a turnout of 86.8%.

Results

References

Syria
1953 in Syria
Presidential elections in Syria
Single-candidate elections